Filip Černák (born 7 June 2001) is a Slovak footballer who plays for Družstevník Veľké Ludince in 3. Liga East as a forward.

Club career

FK Senica
Černák made his Fortuna Liga debut for Senica against Spartak Trnava on 23 February 2020.

References

External links
 FK Senica official club profile 
 Futbalnet profile 
 
 

2001 births
Living people
People from Šurany
Sportspeople from the Nitra Region
Slovak footballers
Slovak expatriate footballers
Association football forwards
FK Senica players
Partizán Bardejov players
NK Krško players
Slovak Super Liga players
2. Liga (Slovakia) players
Slovenian Second League players
3. Liga (Slovakia) players
Expatriate footballers in Slovenia
Slovak expatriate sportspeople in Slovenia